Francisco Javier Mauleón (born 16 September 1965) is a Spanish former professional racing cyclist. He rode in six editions of the Tour de France, two editions of the Giro d'Italia and seven editions of the Vuelta a España.

Major results

1987
1st Overall Circuito Montañés
1st Overall Cinturó de l'Empordà
1988
1st Overall Vuelta a Aragón
1989
1st Stage 3 Vuelta a Burgos
1990
2nd National Road Race Championships
3rd Overall Euskal Bizikleta
1992
2nd Subida al Naranco
9th Overall Vuelta a España
1st Stage 15
1996
1st Subida al Naranco
1997
2nd Overall Volta ao Alentejo

References

External links
 

1965 births
Living people
Spanish male cyclists
Sportspeople from Vitoria-Gasteiz
Cyclists from the Basque Country (autonomous community)